Remain is the second extended play (EP) by South Korean boy group KNK. It contains six tracks, including the lead single, "U".

Background and release
On November 7, 2016, YNB Entertainment announced KNK's comeback by sharing the cover image of their second EP titled Remain through their official SNS channels. A group and "White version" individual image teasers were unveiled on the next two days. The track list was also released on November 10, revealing that Kim Tae-joo once again worked with KNK as the producer, while tracks "Goodbye" and "Tonight" were composed and written by members Youjin and Heejun respectively.

On November 13, KNK released an album preview which gave sneak peeks of each song. A new set of individual image teasers called "Black version" was released the next day. On November 15, the music video teaser for the lead single, "U", was released, however it was announced the following day that the agency and the members decided to dispose the music video due to quality issues. A representative stated that there were no plans to film it again. The album was released on November 17, 2016. It was also released as a digital download on various music portals.

Promotion
On November 17, 2016, KNK held their live comeback show through Naver V Live, where they performed TVXQ's "Love in the Ice", as well as their new songs "I Know" and "U". The group then made their music program comeback stages on Music Bank, Show! Music Core and Inkigayo.

Track listing

Release history

References

2016 EPs
Korean-language EPs
Stone Music Entertainment EPs